Cleta may refer to:

Cleta, one of the Charites in Greek mythology
Cleta (moth), a genus of moths in the family Geometridae
Cleta, Texas, an unincorporated community in Texas